Klossiella quimrensis is a parasite of an Australian marsupial: the western barred bandicoot (Perameles bougainville). 
It causes renal coccidiosis in its host.

Its specific name, quimrensis (Latin for ‘of QIMR’), refers to the Queensland Institute of Medical Research, where it was first observed.

See also 
Other species with acronym names:
 Apterichtus ansp 
 Turbonilla musorstom
 AEECL's sportive lemur

References

Parasites
Parasites of marsupials